National Innovation Foundation (NIF) – India is an autonomous body of the Department of Science and Technology (DST), Government of India. It was set up in February 2000 at Ahmedabad, Gujarat and is India's national initiative to strengthen the grassroots technological innovations and outstanding traditional knowledge. Its mission is to help India become a creative and knowledge-based society by expanding policy and institutional space for grassroots technological innovators.

NIF scouts, supports and spawns' grassroots innovations developed by individuals and local communities in any technological field, helping in human survival without any help from formal sector. It also tries to ensure that such innovations diffuse widely through commercial and/or non-commercial channels, generating material or non-material incentives for them and others involved in the value chain.

Overview
NIF has pooled a database of over 315,000 technological ideas, innovations and traditional knowledge practices (not all unique, not all distinct) from over 608 districts of the country. NIF has till date recognised 992 grassroots innovators and school students at the national level in its various National Biennial Grassroots Innovation Award Functions and annual Dr A P J Abdul Kalam Ignite Children Award functions. In collaboration with various research & development (R&D) and academic institutions, agricultural & veterinary universities and others institutions, NIF has helped in getting several hundred grassroots technologies validated and/or value added.

NIF has also set up an augmented Fabrication Laboratory (Fab Lab) for product development and strengthening in-house research. Pro bono arrangement with intellectual property firms has helped NIF file over 1200 patents, including eight filed in the USA and 28 Patent Cooperation Treaty (PCT) applications, on behalf of the innovators and outstanding traditional knowledge holders. Of these, 153 patents have been granted in India and 5 in the USA. In the same time period NIF has filed 23 Design registrations for innovations of the grassroots and student innovators. In addition to this 10 trade mark applications have also been filed.

NIF has also filed applications for 73 plant varieties developed by farmers at the Protection of Plant Varieties & Farmers' Rights Authority. Of these, 13 have successfully been registered.

Micro Venture Innovation Fund (MVIF) at NIF, with support from Small Industries Development Bank of India (SIDBI), has provided risk capital to 230 innovation based enterprise projects, some of which are at different stages of incubation.

It has also succeeded in commercialising products across countries in six continents, apart from being successful in materialising 120 cases of technology licensing.

NIF has proved that Indian innovators can match anyone in the world when it comes to solving problems creatively. They perform better than others in generating greater sustainable alternatives by using local resources frugally. Those who see poor only as the consumers of cheap goods, miss the richness of knowledge at grassroots level and their potential as provider of ideas and innovations. The grassroots to global (G2G) model that NIF is propagating is all set to change the way the world looks at creativity and innovations at/from grassroots.

The INSPIRE Awards - MANAK (Million Minds Augmenting National Aspiration and Knowledge) was revamped and executed by Department of Science & Technology and National Innovation Foundation-India to align it with the action plan for "Start-up India" initiative launched by the Hon'ble Prime Minister of India. The scheme aims to help build a critical human resource pool for strengthening, expand science and technology system and increase the research & development base on the same by inviting students from all government and private schools throughout the country and enabling them to send their original & creative technological ideas/innovations on the same. During 2019-20, a total of 3,92,486 students have submitted their ideas and innovations under the INSPIRE Awards - MANAK scheme.

References

Scientific organisations based in India
Innovation organizations
Innovation in India
Science and technology in Gujarat
2000 establishments in Gujarat
Scientific organizations established in 2000